La Película Viviente: Mixtape (English: The Living Movie) is the mixtape by Guelo Star, released in 2009.

Track listing

 La Película Viviente (Intro)
 Se Reventó El Party
 La Peli La Peli
 Fuma Blones (feat. Chyno Nyno)
 La Puti Puerca (Remix) (feat. Jamsha, De La Ghetto, Chyno Nyno & Ñejo & Dalmata)
 Sendo Cohete (feat. Jamsha)
 Reggaeton Pa Tol Mundo
 Déjate Sentir (feat. Zion & Lennox)
 Mala Influencia (feat. Jory)
 What You Wanna Do (feat. De La Ghetto)
 Te Conocí (feat. DJ Blass)
 Guillate Cabrón (feat. Speedy)
 Disco Party (feat. Arcángel)
 Película Viviente 
 Azótala Bien
 Bailoteo (feat. Syko)
 Adicta Al Perreo 
 Confusión (Remix) (feat. MC Ceja)
 Pobre Igual Que Yo (feat. Pito Piquete & Tony Lenta)
 Que Tú Dices
 La Impresión (feat. Jory & Nova)
 Los Celos (feat. Neme de Ponce)
 Levantese (feat. Voltio)
 Actívate (feat. MC Ceja)
 Así Es Mi Vida (feat. Syko, Cosculluela, De La Ghetto & Yomo)
 Somos de Calle (Remix) (feat. Daddy Yankee, Arcángel, De La Ghetto, MC Ceja, Voltio, Ñejo, Chyno Nyno, Cosculluela, Baby Rasta)

External links
 http://www.guelostar.com/

Reggaeton albums
2009 mixtape albums